Maithili Rao is an Indian freelance film critic, writer, journalist and former English lecturer based in Mumbai. She has worked for several publications, including The Hindu, Frontline, Film Comment, the Sunday Observer, Gentleman, The Independent, and Screen.

Career
Rao worked as a journalist for The Hindu, Frontline, Film Comment, Gentleman, Man's World, Cinema in India, and South Asian Cinema; the latter two were published by the National Film Development Corporation of India and South Asian Cinema Foundation, which was based in London. She wrote the column "Image of Women" in the newspaper Eye's Weekly for ten years. She is also a film critic for the Sunday Observer, The Independent, Screen, The Free Press Journal, Bombay, and Zee Premiere. In 2003, she contributed to the Encyclopaedia of Hindi Cinema, an encyclopaedia book about Hindi cinema that was published by Popular Prakashan.

Rao served as a jury at The Golden Elephant (also known as International Children's Film Festival India) and the Mumbai International Film Festival. She has authored one books, titled Smita Patil: A Brief Incandescence, a biographical book on the Indian actress Smita Patil published by HarperCollins. According to the Indo-Asian News Service, "The book is not only a long-pending due to this accomplished but instinctive actress but also an invaluable distillation of some of the best of Indian cinema, which could easily rise above mindless escapism to sensitively portray society and its inequities and injustices—especially towards women, whose plight Smita can so touchingly render." The Times of India listed it amongst the "top 25 good reads" of 2015.

Bibliography

References

Indian biographers
Indian women journalists
Living people
Indian women columnists
The Hindu journalists
Year of birth missing (living people)